Gauthier Jean-Paul Boeka-Lisasi (born 6 June 1974) is a Congolese former footballer who played as a centre forward. He played club football for Vita Club, Lokeren, Westerlo, Mechelen, Charleroi, Club Africain, AEL Limassol, Kortrijk, Verbroedering Denderhoutem, Hapoel Haifa,  and international football for the DR Congo national football team.

References

External links

1974 births
Living people
Footballers from Kinshasa
Democratic Republic of the Congo footballers
Democratic Republic of the Congo international footballers
Association football forwards
AS Vita Club players
K.S.C. Lokeren Oost-Vlaanderen players
K.V.C. Westerlo players
K.V. Mechelen players
R. Charleroi S.C. players
Club Africain players
AEL Limassol players
K.V. Kortrijk players
F.C.V. Dender E.H. players
Hapoel Haifa F.C. players
Belgian Pro League players
Challenger Pro League players
Tunisian Ligue Professionnelle 1 players
Cypriot First Division players
Belgian Third Division players
Liga Leumit players
21st-century Democratic Republic of the Congo people